Sandra Bruflot (born 31 December 1991) is a Norwegian politician for the Conservative Party. She represents Buskerud at the Storting from 2021.

Political career
Hailing from Lier, Bruflot was a member of the municipal council of Lier from 2011 to 2019, as well of the county council of Buskerud from 2015 to 2019. From 2013 to 2017 she was deputy representative to the Storting. She is member of the county council of Viken from 2019, and was elected representative to the Storting from the constituency of Buskerud for the period 2021–2025, for the Conservative Party. In the Storting, she was member of the Standing Committee on Health and Care Services from 2021.

She chaired the Norwegian Young Conservatives from 2018 to 2020, having been vice chair from 2014 to 2018.

Personal life
Bruflot married Christopher Wand in 2018.

References

1991 births
Living people
Conservative Party (Norway) politicians
Buskerud politicians
Members of the Storting
Women members of the Storting